Kozloduy Municipality is a municipality in Vratsa Province, Bulgaria.

Demography
The municipality consists of 5 settlements with a total population of 21,180 inhabitants (February 1, 2011). The town and 4 villages - Butan, Harlets, Glozhene and Kriva Bara.

Religion
According to the latest Bulgarian census of 2011, the religious composition, among those who answered the optional question on religious identification, was the following:

References

Geography of Vratsa Province